Guido Citterio (born 14 July 1931) is an Italian speed skater. He competed at the 1952 Winter Olympics and the 1956 Winter Olympics.

References

External links
 

1931 births
Possibly living people
Italian male speed skaters
Olympic speed skaters of Italy
Speed skaters at the 1952 Winter Olympics
Speed skaters at the 1956 Winter Olympics
Sportspeople from Milan